The 2019-20 Supercopa de España was the 36th edition of the Supercopa de España, an annual football competition for clubs in the Spanish football league system that were successful in its major competitions in the preceding season.

In February 2019, it was announced that the competition would be changed from a two-team format to four teams, which would include a semi-final round. The semi-final round was played on 8 and 9 January 2020, and the final was held on 12 January; there was no third-place game.

The final was contested between Real Madrid and Atlético Madrid and was won by Real Madrid 4–1 on penalties, following a 0–0 draw after extra time, to win their 11th Supercopa title.

It was played in Saudi Arabia after the Saudi government offered to pay 40 million euros for each of the next three seasons.

Qualification
The tournament was supposed to feature the winners and runners-up of the 2018–19 Copa del Rey and 2018–19 La Liga. However, as Barcelona were La Liga winners and Copa del Rey runners-up, the extra spot was awarded to La Liga third-placed Real Madrid.

Qualified teams
The following four teams qualified for the tournament.

Draw
The draw was held on 11 November at the Royal Spanish Football Federation headquarters, in La Ciudad del Fútbol. There was no restriction in it.

Matches
 Times listed are UTC+3.
 All three matches were held in King Abdullah Sports City in Jeddah, Saudi Arabia.

Bracket

Semi-finals

Final

Criticism
The Spanish section of Amnesty International criticized the election of Saudi Arabia as the playground, citing the situation of human rights, specifically the death penalty, the Saudi intervention in Yemen, murder of Jamal Khashoggi, freedom of expression and the situation of women's rights.
The Spanish government had also disapproved the possibility of playing in Saudi Arabia.
The president of the RFEF, Luis Rubiales negotiated with Saudi authorities that, during the competition, female spectators could sit anywhere in the stadium, not being limited to a women-exclusive area.
AI approved the achievement but contended that it is not enough.

Saudi authorities had already brought the 2019 Supercoppa Italiana to the country.

References

2019–20 in Spanish football cups
2019
January 2020 sports events in Asia
International club association football competitions hosted by Saudi Arabia
2019–20 in Saudi Arabian football
2020 in Saudi Arabian sport